The Trail Drive is a 1933 American Western film directed by Alan James and written by Alan James and Nate Gatzert. The film stars Ken Maynard, Cecilia Parker, William Gould, Frank Rice, Bob Kortman and Fern Emmett. The film was released on September 4, 1933, by Universal Pictures.

Plot

Cast          
Ken Maynard as Ken Benton
Cecilia Parker as Virginia
William Gould as Honest John
Frank Rice as Thirsty
Bob Kortman as Blake
Fern Emmett as Aunt Martha
Jack Rockwell as The Marshal
Lafe McKee as Jameson

References

External links
 

1933 films
American Western (genre) films
1933 Western (genre) films
Universal Pictures films
Films directed by Alan James
American black-and-white films
1930s English-language films
1930s American films